Vana (also Romanized as Vānā; also known as Vāneh and Wahna) is a village in Bala Larijan Rural District, Larijan District, Amol County, Mazandaran Province, Iran. At the 2006 census, its population was 304, in 89 families.

References 

Populated places in Amol County